Andrew Williamson may refer to:

 Andrew Williamson (judge) (born 1946), former Deputy Deemster of the Isle of Man
 Andrew Williamson (soldier) (c. 1730–1786), Scots immigrant